The  was an electric multiple unit (EMU) train type operated by the Tokyo subway operator Tokyo Metro on the Tokyo Metro Chiyoda Line in Tokyo, Japan from 1971 to 2018. A number of trainsets have been exported to Indonesia for use by Kereta Commuter Indonesia following their withdrawal in Japan.

The trains have 20 m aluminium 4-door cars, and are used on the Chiyoda Line, as well as Odakyu Odawara Line, and Joban Line (all-stations "local" services). The sole three-car set was used on the Chiyoda Line Kita-Ayase branch line.

Fleet
 6000: 1st prototype (1968)
 6101: 2nd prototype (1969)
 6102–6121: full production 1st–3rd full-production batch type
 6122–6135: full production 4th–7th full-production batch type

, the remaining fleet still operating in Japan consisted of 2 ten-car sets (sets 02 and 30).

The 6000 series was scheduled for its final commercial operation on 13 October 2018. They were finally retired from service on 11 November 2018, after their final seasonal run. The last trainset retired was Set 30. It was shipped to Jakarta, Indonesia at the end of 2018.

Formations
Trains are formed as follows, with car 1 at the southern end.

Set 01

Cars 1 and 3 each have one lozenge-type pantograph, and cars 5 and 9 each have two.

Sets 02–21

Cars 2, 5, and 9 each have two lozenge-type pantographs.

Sets 22–35

Cars 3, 7, and 9 each have two lozenge-type pantographs.

Set 60

Cars 1 and 2 each have one lozenge-type pantograph.

Interior

History

The TRTA 6000 series won the 1972 Laurel Prize from the Japan Railfan Club.

Refurbishment
The fleet was retro-fitted with air conditioning between 1988 and 1994. The fleet then underwent a programme of refurbishment between 1988 and 2007.

Retirement
The 6000 series trains have been in service since 1971, and have begun to show their age. In the 2010's, Tokyo Metro thought the 6000 series were becoming unreliable. As of 2018, they have been replaced by the 16000 series.

Resale to Indonesia

A number of 6000 series sets have been shipped to Kereta Commuter Indonesia in Jakarta, Indonesia, as listed below.

VVVF refurbished sets were shipped to Indonesia from 2016, with the first three sets arrived at the Port of Tanjung Priok in Jakarta on 29 July 2016.

The earlier chopper-controlled sets run as eight-car formations, while the refurbished VVVF-controlled sets operate as ten-car formations. But some sets are could be shortened because it's could be repaired.

Training set

The three-car prototype set 6000, used on the Kita-Ayase branch line until 2014, is used as a staff training unit at Shin-Kiba Depot in Koto, Tokyo.

Fleet history
The individual set histories are as shown below.

Related development

Both the Tokyo Metro 7000 series and the Tokyo Metro 8000 series were based on the 6000 series for the Yurakucho Line, Fukutoshin Line, and the Hanzomon Line. The cab car was inspired by Bay Area Rapid Transit (BART) in the San Francisco Bay Area, thus created the A-cars as the end cars only.

Gallery

References

External links

 Tokyo Metro Chiyoda Line 6000 series information 

Electric multiple units of Japan
6000 series
Kawasaki multiple units
Nippon Sharyo multiple units
Train-related introductions in 1971
Electric multiple units of Indonesia
Kinki Sharyo multiple units
Tokyu Car multiple units
1500 V DC multiple units of Japan